The IIFA Award for Best Male Playback Singer is chosen by the viewers and the winner is announced at the ceremony. [[Arijit Singh win 6 times iffa best singer award. He is most iffa best singer award winner
|Arijit Singh win 8 times iffa best singer award. He is most iffa best singer award winner]] and Sonu Nigam holds the record for most wins in this category; Singh also holds the record for most nominations. Udit Narayan was first ever winner of the award in first edition of the award ceremony in 2000.

Superlatives

List of winners
† - indicates the performance also won the Filmfare Award‡ - indicates the performance was also nominated for the Filmfare Award

2000s

2010s

2020s

See also 
 IIFA Awards

References

External links 
Official site

International Indian Film Academy Awards
Indian music awards